is a town located in Yamagata Prefecture, Japan. , the town had an estimated population of 13,482 in 4730 households, and a population density of 85 persons per km².

Geography
Shirataka is located in southern Yamagata Prefecture, with the Mogami River running through the center of town. The Asahi Mountains border the town to the east and west.

Neighboring municipalities
Yamagata Prefecture
Nagai
Nan'yō
Yamanobe
Asahi

Climate
Shirataka has a Humid continental climate (Köppen climate classification Dfa) with large seasonal temperature differences, with warm to hot (and often humid) summers and cold (sometimes severely cold) winters. Precipitation is significant throughout the year, but is heaviest from August to October.

Demographics
Per Japanese census data, the population of Shirataka has declined over the past 60 years.

History
The area of present-day Shirataka was part of ancient Dewa Province. After the start of the Meiji period, the area became part of Nishiokitama District, Yamagata Prefecture. The village of Shirataka was established on April 1, 1889 with the creation of the modern municipalities system. It was elevated to town status on October 1, 1954 by merger with the neighboring town of Arata and villages of Higashine, Ayukai, Jūō, and Koguwa.

Economy
The economy of Shirataka is based on agriculture, with hops as a major cash crop.

Education
Shirataka has four public elementary schools and one public middle school operated by the city government and one public high school operated by the Yamagata Prefectural Board of Education.

Transportation

Railway
 Yamagata Railway Company - Flower Nagai Line
  -  -  -

Highway

Local attractions
Kannon-ji Kannon-do (Important Cultural Property)

References

External links
 
Official Website 

 
Towns in Yamagata Prefecture